In mathematics, physics, electronics, control systems engineering, and statistics, the frequency domain refers to the analysis of mathematical functions or signals with respect to frequency, rather than time.  Put simply, a time-domain graph shows how a signal changes over time, whereas a frequency-domain graph shows how much of the signal lies within each given frequency band over a range of frequencies.  A frequency-domain representation can also include information on the phase shift that must be applied to each sinusoid in order to be able to recombine the frequency components to recover the original time signal.

A given function or signal can be converted between the time and frequency domains with a pair of mathematical operators called transforms.  An example is the Fourier transform, which converts a time function into a complex valued sum or integral of sine waves of different frequencies, with amplitudes and phases, each of which represents a frequency component.  The "spectrum" of frequency components is the frequency-domain representation of the signal.  The inverse Fourier transform converts the frequency-domain function back to the time-domain function. A spectrum analyzer is a tool commonly used to visualize electronic signals in the frequency domain.

Some specialized signal processing techniques use transforms that result in a joint time–frequency domain, with the instantaneous frequency being a key link between the time domain and the frequency domain.

Advantages
One of the main reasons for using a frequency-domain representation of a problem is to simplify the mathematical analysis.  For mathematical systems governed by linear differential equations, a very important class of systems with many real-world applications, converting the description of the system from the time domain to a frequency domain converts the differential equations to algebraic equations, which are much easier to solve.
   
In addition, looking at a system from the point of view of frequency can often give an intuitive understanding of the qualitative behavior of the system, and a revealing scientific nomenclature has grown up to describe it, characterizing the behavior of physical systems to time varying inputs using terms such as bandwidth, frequency response, gain, phase shift, resonant frequencies, time constant, resonance width, damping factor, Q factor, harmonics, spectrum, power spectral density, eigenvalues, poles, and zeros.

An example of a field in which frequency-domain analysis gives a better understanding than time domain is music; the theory of operation of musical instruments and the musical notation used to record and discuss pieces of music is implicitly based on the breaking down of complex sounds into their separate component frequencies (musical notes).

Magnitude and phase

In using the Laplace, Z-, or Fourier transforms, a signal is described by a complex function of frequency: the component of the signal at any given frequency is given by a complex number. The modulus of the number is the amplitude of that component, and the argument is the relative phase of the wave.  For example, using the Fourier transform, a sound wave, such as human speech, can be broken down into its component tones of different frequencies, each represented by a sine wave of a different amplitude and phase.  The response of a system, as a function of frequency, can also be described by a complex function.  In many applications, phase information is not important.  By discarding the phase information, it is possible to simplify the information in a frequency-domain representation to generate a frequency spectrum or spectral density.     A spectrum analyzer is a device that displays the spectrum, while the time-domain signal can be seen on an oscilloscope.

Types

Although "the" frequency domain is spoken of in the singular, there are a number of different mathematical transforms which are used to analyze time-domain functions and are referred to as "frequency domain" methods. These are the most common transforms, and the fields in which they are used:
 Fourier series – periodic signals, oscillating systems.
 Fourier transform – aperiodic signals, transients.
 Laplace transform – electronic circuits and control systems.
 Z transform – discrete-time signals, digital signal processing.
 Wavelet transform — image analysis, data compression.
The above transforms can be interpreted as capturing some form of frequency, and hence the transform domain is referred to as a frequency domain.

Discrete frequency domain 

A discrete frequency domain is a frequency domain that is discrete rather than continuous. 
For example, the discrete Fourier transform maps a function having a discrete time domain into one having a discrete frequency domain. The discrete-time Fourier transform, on the other hand, maps functions with discrete time (discrete-time signals) to functions that have a continuous frequency domain.

The Fourier transform of a periodic signal has energy only at a base frequency and its harmonics. Another way of saying this is that a periodic signal can be analyzed using a discrete frequency domain. Dually, a discrete-time signal gives rise to a periodic frequency spectrum. Combining these two, if we start with a time signal which is both discrete and periodic, we get a frequency spectrum which is also both discrete and periodic. This is the usual context for a discrete Fourier transform.

History of term
The use of the terms "frequency domain" and "time domain" arose in communication engineering in the 1950s and early 1960s, with "frequency domain" appearing in 1953. See time domain: origin of term for details.

See also

 Bandwidth
 Blackman–Tukey transformation
 Fourier analysis for computing periodicity in evenly spaced data
 Least-squares spectral analysis for computing periodicity in unevenly spaced data
 Short-time Fourier transform
 Time–frequency representation
 Time–frequency analysis
 Wavelet
 Wavelet transform – digital image processing, signal compression

References

Goldshleger, N., Shamir, O., Basson, U., Zaady, E. (2019). Frequency Domain Electromagnetic Method (FDEM) as tool to study contamination at the sub-soil layer. Geoscience 9 (9), 382.

Further reading
.
.

Frequency-domain analysis